Giovanni Battista da Ponte (1553–1613) was an Italian painter of the Renaissance period, active  in Venice and his native Bassano del Grappa. He was the second son of Jacopo da Ponte. He was chiefly known as a copyist of his father's works. Many of his productions now figure, no doubt, under Jacopo's name. Also known as Giovanni Battista Bassano.

References

1533 births
1613 deaths
16th-century Italian painters
Italian male painters
17th-century Italian painters
Painters from Venice
Italian Mannerist painters
People from the Province of Vicenza
People from Bassano del Grappa